Olivier Le Peuch (born 1963/1964) is a French businessman, and the chief executive officer (CEO) of Schlumberger, the world's largest oilfield services company, effective 1 August 2019.

Biography
Le Peuch was born and raised in France. He earned a bachelor's degree in electrical engineering, and a master's degree in microelectronics, both from ENSEIRB-MATMECA and University of Bordeaux.

In 1987, Le Peuch joined Schlumberger as an electrical engineer. He has worked for Schlumberger for 32 years (as of July 2019), rising to chief operating officer (COO) in February 2019, before succeeding Paal Kibsgaard as CEO on 1 August 2019.

References

Living people
Businesspeople in the oil industry
French chief executives
University of Bordeaux alumni
French electrical engineers
1960s births
Schlumberger people